The Sherbet Phenomenon is the fourth compilation album by  Australian rock band Sherbet released in 1980.

Track listing

Chart positions

Personnel 
 Bass, vocals – Tony Mitchell
 Drums – Alan Sandow
 Guitar, vocals – Clive Shakespeare
 Keyboards, vocals – Garth Porter
 Lead vocals – Daryl Braithwaite

References 

Sherbet (band) compilation albums
1980 compilation albums
Albums produced by Clive Shakespeare
Albums produced by Garth Porter
Albums produced by Richard Batchens